Saint Charbel of Edessa (also Sarvillos, Zarvilos, Sarbelus, Thathuil, Thiphael, Sarbelius, Charbil, Sharbel, Sharbil) (died 107 AD) is an early 2nd-century Syriac saint and Christian martyr venerated by the Roman Catholic as well as the Eastern Orthodox churches. He was put to death during the Persecution of Christians under the Roman Emperor Trajan. His sister, Bebaia of Edessa (also Barbe, Thivea), was put to death soon afterwards. The two martyrs are venerated on January 29.
His story is linked to that of Saint Barsimaeus, who was said to have converted him to Christianity from Paganism, and may be backdated from events that took place in Edessa under the emperor Decius (r. 249–251).

Saint Charbel of Edessa has many shrines in Lebanon in the Maronite Church with the exception of a ruined Greek Orthodox shrine in Douma, Lebanon. The major shrine is located in the village of Maad, Lebanon. It was built on the ruins of a pagan temple and has exceptional frescoes dating to the 12th century AD. Other shrines are located in Jezzine, Mar Elias Street in Beirut, Adonis, Ibrine.

Notes

107 deaths
1st-century births
2nd-century Christian martyrs